WSUC may refer to:

 WSUC-FM, a radio station (90.5 FM) licensed to Cortland, New York, United States
 New York University College of Arts and Science, formerly Washington Square and University College 
 Wisconsin State University Conference, former intercollegiate college athletic conference